Volkovsky (masculine), Volkovskaya (feminine), or Volkovskoye (neuter) is the name of several rural localities in Russia:
Volkovsky, Chelyabinsk Oblast, a settlement in Stepnoy Selsoviet of Verkhneuralsky District of Chelyabinsk Oblast
Volkovsky, Novosibirsk Oblast, a settlement in Chulymsky District of Novosibirsk Oblast
Volkovskoye (rural locality), a selo in Tarussky District of Kaluga Oblast
Volkovskaya (rural locality), a village in Toropetsky District of Tver Oblast

ru:Волковский